O Rei dos Ciganos is a Brazilian telenovela produced and broadcast by TV Globo. It premiered on 12 September 1966 and ended on 20 February 1967. It's the second "novela das oito" to be aired on the timeslot.

Cast

References 

TV Globo telenovelas
1966 Brazilian television series debuts
1967 Brazilian television series endings
1966 telenovelas
Brazilian telenovelas
Portuguese-language telenovelas